Mohamed Youssouf (born 26 March 1988) is a  professional footballer who plays as a midfielder for  club Ajaccio. Born in France, he plays for the Comoros national team.

Club career
Born in Paris, Youssouf began his career in 2005 with Le Havre.

In July 2015, after his contract with Ergotelis expired, Youssouf signed a two-year contract deal with Veria until 30 June 2017. He debuted for the club on 23 August 2015 against PAS Giannina.

On 8 January 2017, Youssouf signed for Super League Greece club Levadiakos for an undisclosed fee.

International career 
Youssouf was selected for the Comoros national team at the 2021 Africa Cup of Nations.

Career statistics
Scores and results list Comoros goal tally first, score column indicates score after each Youssouf goal.

References

External links
 
 
 
 

1988 births
Living people
French sportspeople of Comorian descent
Comorian footballers
French footballers
Footballers from Paris
Association football midfielders
Comoros international footballers
2021 Africa Cup of Nations players
Le Havre AC players
US Créteil-Lusitanos players
Vannes OC players
Amiens SC players
Ergotelis F.C. players
Veria F.C. players
Levadiakos F.C. players
AC Ajaccio players
Ligue 1 players
Ligue 2 players
Championnat National players
Championnat National 3 players
Super League Greece players
Black French sportspeople
Comorian expatriate footballers
Comorian expatriate sportspeople in France
Expatriate footballers in France
Comorian expatriate sportspeople in Greece
Expatriate footballers in Greece